Decoigne is a locality in Alberta, Canada.  It is located west of Jasper, near the border with British Columbia.

The community has the name of François Decoigne, a fur trader.

References 

Localities in Jasper, Alberta